Maruthadi or Maruthady is a coastal town situated in the city of Kollam, Kerala, India. The place is very famous in the state for its fishing activities.  The presence of Kattaka Kayal, a two-km long stream that once served as the lifeline for most of the commercial activities at Sakthikulangara and the 36-acre Vattakayal are making Maruthadi an important tourism spot in the city.

Location
 Ramankulangara (NH-47) - 2.8 km
 Andamukkam City Bus Stand - 7.3 km
 Kollam KSRTC Bus Station - 6.4 km
 Kollam Junction railway station - 7.6 km
 Kollam Port - 6.2 km
 Chinnakada - 6.9 km
 Kadappakada - 8.6 km
 Thirumullavaram - 4 km

Kollam Port City Project
The Kerala Government has decided to develop the City of Kollam as a "Port City of Kerala". They have decided to do a face lift of the Maruthadi-Eravipuram area of the city as part of the "Kollam Port City" project. Sports, Fishing, Tourism and entertainment projects will be implemented in this region as part of the project

See also
 Andamukkam City Bus Stand
 Asramam Maidan
 Chinnakada
 Kadappakada
 Kollam
 Kollam Beach

References

Neighbourhoods in Kollam